Ever Gabo Anderson (born November 3, 2007) is an American actress and model. She is known for portraying a young Natasha Romanoff in the 2021 film Black Widow and will star as Wendy Darling in the 2023 film Peter Pan & Wendy.

Early life
Her mother is Ukrainian-born actress Milla Jovovich and her father is British director Paul W. S. Anderson. She has two younger sisters, Dashiel and Osian. She is of Russian and Serbian descent through her mother, and of English descent through her father.

Career
Her parents tried to discourage her entering into acting but she could not be dissuaded. At age nine, she was on the cover of Vogue Bambini, photographed by Ellen von Unwerth. She's also been photographed by Karl Lagerfeld, Mikael Jansson, and Peter Lindbergh. 

Her first feature film appearance was in Resident Evil: The Final Chapter in 2016, which was directed by her father. In it, she played a younger Alicia Marcus, who is played by her mother as an adult.

In March 2020, it was revealed that she would play a younger version of Natasha Romanoff in the 2021 Marvel Cinematic Universe (MCU) film Black Widow, as well as Wendy Darling in the 2023 film Peter Pan & Wendy.

Personal life
Anderson practices taekwondo. She lives in the Hollywood Hills neighborhood of Los Angeles, California. In addition to her native languages, English and
Russian, she can also speak French and Japanese.

Filmography

Film

References

External links
 

21st-century American actresses
Living people
2007 births
Female models from California
Actresses from Hollywood, Los Angeles
American child actresses
American female taekwondo practitioners
American people of English descent 
American people of Serbian descent 
American people of Montenegrin descent 
American people of Russian descent